The Miss Ecuador 1989 was held on June 15, 1988. There were 15 candidates for the national title. In the end of night, Cecilia Pozo from Guayas crowned María Eugenia Molina as Miss Ecuador 1989. The Miss Ecuador competed in Miss Universe 1989, and the 1st Runner-up competed at Miss World 1988.

Results

Placements

Special awards

Contestants

Casting

A casting was held in 1989 to select the Ecuadorian representative to compete at Miss World 1989.

Notes

Debuts

 Cotopaxi

Returns

Last compete in:

1984
 Azuay
 Loja
1985
 El Oro

Withdraws

 Tungurahua

External links

Miss Ecuador
1989 beauty pageants
Beauty pageants in Ecuador
1989 in Ecuador